Scuttle Valley is a small deglaciated valley with meltwater lakes that lies parallel to and just south of Towle Glacier in the Convoy Range, Victoria Land, Antarctica. The feature was visited by Victoria University of Wellington Antarctic Expedition (VUWAE), 1976–77, led by Christopher J. Burgess. The name derives from the discovery of a parachute and abandoned airdrop packaging in the vicinity.

Valleys of Victoria Land
Scott Coast